Noun is a department of West Province in Cameroon. The department covers an area of 7700 km and as of 2005 had a total population of 1,540,000. The capital of the department lies at Foumban.

Subdivisions
The division is divided administratively into nine communes and in turn into villages.

Communes 
 Foumban (urban)
 Foumbot
 Kouoptamo
 Koutaba
 Malentouen
 Massangam
 Njimom

References

Departments of Cameroon
West Region (Cameroon)